Georg Kandlinger (20 March 1949 – 16 November 2020) was a German cross-country skier. He competed in the men's 15 kilometre event at the 1976 Winter Olympics.

References

External links
 

1949 births
2020 deaths
German male cross-country skiers
Olympic cross-country skiers of West Germany
Cross-country skiers at the 1976 Winter Olympics
People from Miesbach (district)
Sportspeople from Upper Bavaria
20th-century German people